The Chicago Blaze was a professional hockey team based in Rolling Meadows, Illinois. The team was part of the All American Hockey League and began playing in the 2008-2009 AAHL season. The Blaze played their home games at West Meadows Ice Arena in Rolling Meadows, Illinois. The Blaze were coached by Steve Pronger, a former assistant coach for the Flint Generals.

Seasons

External links
Official Chicago Blaze website
Official AAHL website

Sports in Cook County, Illinois
Defunct ice hockey teams in Illinois
Blaze